The 1984 Kentucky Derby was the 110th running of the Kentucky Derby. The race took place on May 5, 1984, with 126,453 people in attendance. The race was won by Swale, who went on to finish out of the money in the Preakness, then won the Belmont.

Full results

 Winning breeder: Claiborne Farm (KY)

Notes

References

Further reading

External links
 1984 Kentucky Derby via YouTube

1984
Kentucky Derby
Derby
Kentucky
Kentucky Derby